Charlotte Barras (born 26 January 1982) is an English rugby union player. She is a PE teacher.

Barras was a member of the 2009 Rugby World Cup Sevens squad.

References

1982 births
Living people
England women's international rugby union players
English female rugby union players
Female rugby sevens players
England international women's rugby sevens players